Sink is a Foetus Inc compilation album that was first released in 1989 on Self Immolation/Some Bizzare.  It compiles rare and unreleased songs from various Foetus projects from 1981–1989.  Many of the rare tracks on the album have been edited shorter than their original length.

Sink is Foetus' final Some Bizzare record and it was released  in 1995 thanks to Some Bizzare Label Thirsty Ear's effort to reissue the Foetus catalogue.  All versions' liner notes contain an up-to-date Foetus discography.

Sink is Self Immolation #WOMB INC 6.

Track listing
All songs by J. G. Thirlwell.

"Bedrock"   – 7:07 by The Foetus All Nude Revue
as on Bedrock
"Ramrod"   – 5:49 by Scraping Foetus off the Wheel
edited from Ramrod
"Boxhead"   – 3:40 by Scraping Foetus off the Wheel
as on Ramrod
"Lilith"   – 4:17  by Foetus Eruptus
previously unreleased
"Shut"   – 0:54 by The Foetus All Nude Revue
as on Bedrock
"Diabolus in Musica"   – 7:06 by The Foetus All Nude Revue
edited from Bedrock
"Smut"   – 3:44 by Scraping Foetus off the Wheel
edited from Ramrod
"Sick Minutes"   – 2:20 by Foetus Über Frisco
edited from Finely Honed Machine and the Hole U.S. release bonus 12"
"Rattlesnake Insurance"   – 1:49 by The Foetus All Nude Revue
as on Bedrock
"Himmelfahrtstransport / Primordial Industry"   – 2:08  by Foetus In Your Bed
"Himmelfahrtstransport" previously unreleased
"Primordial Industry" edited from An Afflicted Man's Musica Box compilation
"Spit on the Griddle (The Drowning of G. Walhof)"  – 3:39  by Foetus Eruptus
previously unreleased
"Anxiety Attack"   – 5:44, [– 5:09 CD] by Scraping Foetus off the Wheel
previously unreleased
"Baphomet"   – 1:05  by Foetus Interruptus
previously unreleased
"(The Only Good Christian is a) Dead Christian"   – 3:21 by Scraping Foetus off the Wheel
as on If You Can't Please Yourself, You Can't Please Your Soul compilation
"Halo Flamin Lead"   – 4:24 by Scraping Foetus off the Wheel
edited from the NME compilation cassette Mad Mix 2 (credited to You've Got Foetus on Your Breath) and the Hole U.S. release bonus 12"
"OKFM"   – 4:25 by Foetus Under Glass
edited from Spite Your Face/OKFM
"Catastrophe Crunch"   – 4:12 by Foetus Art Terrorism
edited from Calamity Crush
"Wash (It All Off)"   – 3:57 by You've Got Foetus on Your Breath
edited from Wash/Slog and the Hole U.S. release bonus 12"
"(Today I Started) Slog(ging Again)"   – 4:51 by You've Got Foetus on Your Breath
edited from Wash/Slog and the Hole U.S. release bonus 12"
"Calamity Crush"   – 4:12 by Foetus Art Terrorism
edited from Calamity Crush

Personnel and production
J. G. Thirlwell - Performance, production, composition
Warne Livesey - Engineering, recording, mixing
Harlan Cockburn - Engineering, recording, mixing
Charles Gray - Engineering, recording, mixing
Martin Bisi - Engineering, recording, mixing, editing

References

External links
Sink at foetus.org

Foetus (band) albums
Albums produced by JG Thirlwell
1989 compilation albums
Some Bizzare Records albums
Wax Trax! Records albums
Thirsty Ear Recordings albums